Cristian Buonaiuto (born 29 December 1992) is an Italian professional footballer who plays as a striker for  club Cremonese.

Club career
On 17 August 2018, he returned to his first professional club Benevento on a season-long loan with a buyout option and obligation from Perugia.

On 4 September 2020 he joined Cremonese.

References

External links
sport.sky.it 

Living people
1992 births
Italian footballers
Footballers from Naples
Association football forwards
Serie A players
Serie B players
Serie C players
Benevento Calcio players
F.C. Aprilia Racing Club players
Calcio Padova players
S.S. Teramo Calcio players
Delfino Pescara 1936 players
A.C. Perugia Calcio players
Latina Calcio 1932 players
U.S. Cremonese players
S.E.F. Torres 1903 players
S.S. Maceratese 1922 players